William Bridges Hunter (February 19, 1883 – August 25, 1966)  was an American track and field athlete who competed in the 1904 Summer Olympics. He competed in the 60 metres. He did not make it out of the heats, finishing outside the top two and so failing to qualify automatically or for the repechage.

See also 
 United States at the 1904 Summer Olympics

References

Sources
 

1883 births
1966 deaths
American male sprinters
Olympic track and field athletes of the United States
Athletes (track and field) at the 1904 Summer Olympics